This is a list of Spanish television related events from 2016.

Events
 1 February - Canal+ is replaced by the new channel #0.
 21 April -  TV Channel Be Mad, is launched.
 28 April - Two new channels start broadcasting: Ten and DKiss. Real Madrid TV broadcasts Free-to-air for the first time.
 1 June - Sport TV Channel GOL PLAY is launched.
 28 November - HBO operates in Spain for the first time.

Debuts

Television shows

Ending this year

Changes of network affiliation

Deaths

 13 January - Ignacio Salas, host, 70.
 13 February - Conchita Goyanes, actress, 69.
 21 February - Eugenio Martín Rubio, meteorologist, 93.
 30 March - Francisco Algora, actor, 67.
 4 May - Ángel de Andrés López, actor, 64.
 19 May - Miguel Lluch, director, 93.
 20 May - Miguel de la Quadra-Salcedo, reporter, 84.
 11 July - Emma Cohen, actress, 69.
 29 September - Amparo Valle, actress, 79.
 17 October - Elena Santonja, hostess, 84.
 9 November - La Veneno, vedette, 52.

See also
2016 in Spain

References